Thottambedu is a village in Tirupati district of the Indian state of Andhra Pradesh. It is the mandal headquarters of Thottambedu mandal.

References 

Mandal headquarters in Tirupati district
Villages in Tirupati district